Old Smokey is the nickname for the electric chair in New Jersey and Pennsylvania.

Old Smoky or Old Smokey may also refer to:

 John Morrissey (1831–1878), nicknamed "Old Smoke"
 Live in Old Smokey, a 2006 CD by Linda Lewis
 Old Smokey, a location in Beaver Valley
 Old Smokey, an episode of The Captain and the Kids
 "On Top of Old Smoky", a 1951 traditional American folk song
 On Top of Old Smoky (film), a 1953 film

See also
 Smokey (disambiguation)
 Smokie (disambiguation)
 Smoky (disambiguation)